Eugene F. Correia International Airport  is located on the Atlantic Ocean coast of Guyana,  east of the capital, Georgetown, in the Demerara-Mahaica region.

In 2013, LIAT began scheduled passenger airline flights between the airport and Barbados, thus switching over its former air service into Cheddi Jagan International Airport.

The airport was formerly known as Georgetown-Ogle International Airport and is the second international airport along with the Cheddi Jagan International Airport to serve Georgetown and its vicinity.

History 
In 2003, the airport was a local hub shuttling some 50,000 passengers and 1,800 tons of cargo annually. Construction began that year to expand the facility to an international airport, with upgraded facilities for immigration, customs, air traffic control, health and fire service. The lengthened and expanded runway is now in service, and a ceremony to formally open the new airport terminal was held in March, 2007.

OGL received its port-of-entry certification in 2009. It has a Class 1A, -long runway made of concrete (07-25). The former runway 07R-25L is now being used as a taxiway only. It operates under Visual Flight Rules (VFR) and Instrument Flight Rules (IFR). The airport is capable of handling smaller business jets as well as regional turboprop airliners, such as the Beechcraft 1900D flown by Trans Guyana Airways as well as the ATR-72-600 operated by Caribbean Airlines.

Airlines and destinations

Other facilities
The airline Fly Jamaica Airways formerly maintained its Guyana ticket office in the Wings Aviation hangar in the airport, although Fly Jamaica Airways served Georgetown via Cheddi Jagan International Airport, located south of the city. Fly Jamaica is no longer in business.

Omni Aviation operates Sikorsky S-92 helicopters from the airport in support of offshore oil and gas exploration activities.

See also
 List of airports in Guyana
 Transport in Guyana

References

External links
OpenStreetMap – Ogle
OurAirports – Ogle

Airports in Guyana